Moradi is a surname. Notable people with the surname include:

Ali Akbar Moradi (born 1957), Iranian musician
Amir Moradi (born 1990), Iranian middle-distance runner
Elshan Moradi (born 1985), Iranian chess grandmaster
Houshang Moradi Kermani (born 1944), Iranian writer
Jafad Moradi (born 1984), Iranian football player
Masoud Moradi (born 1965), Iranian football referee
Mike Moradi, American biochemist, entrepreneur and diabetes advocate
Mohammad Jafar Moradi (born 1990), Iranian long distance runner
Sajjad Moradi (born 1983), Iranian middle distance runner
Shahmirza Moradi (1924–1997), Iranian sorna player
Sohrab Moradi (born 1988), Iranian weightlifter
Zak Moradi (born 1990), Kurdish-Irish hurler
Zaniar Moradi (1987–2018), executed Kurd political prisoner

See also
Moradi (disambiguation)
Moradei
Morandi
Mouradian (disambiguation)